Ruben Brandt, Collector is a 2018 Hungarian animated crime thriller film directed by .  It is the first feature film of the Slovenian-born director, who previously won a Silver Bear for Best Short Film at the Berlin International Film Festival in 1995. The film tells the story of a psychotherapist who enlists creative thieves to steal the paintings that are haunting his dreams.

Plot
TBA

Production
TBA

Paintings depicted in the movie
The film depicts the following thirteen paintings that haunted Ruben Brandt:
Frédéric Bazille – Portrait of Renoir (1867)
Sandro Botticelli – The Birth of Venus (c. 1486)
Hans Holbein the Younger – Portrait of Antoine, Prince of Lorraine (c.1543)
Frank Duveneck – Whistling Boy (1872)
Paul Gauguin – Woman Holding A Fruit (1893)
Vincent van Gogh – Portrait of the Postman Joseph Roulin (1888)
Edward Hopper – Nighthawks (1942) 
René Magritte – The Treachery of Images (1929)
Édouard Manet – Olympia (1863)
Pablo Picasso – Woman with book (1932)
Tiziano Vecellio – Venus of Urbino (1538)
Diego Velázquez – Infanta Margarita Teresa in a Blue Dress (1659)
Andy Warhol – Elvis l, ll (1964)

Awards and accolades
In 2018, the film received Annie Awards nominations in two categories, Best Animated Independent Feature and Editorial in an Animated Feature Production. The film received awards at the following film festivals:

 Bucharest International Animation Film Festival (Anim'est) (2018): Best Feature Film
 Seville European Film Festival (2018): Best Screenplay Award; Art Cinema Award
 Trieste Film Festival (2019): Sky Arte Award
 Anima - The Brussels Animation Film Festival (2019): BeTV Award for Best Animated Feature of the Official Selection
 World Festival of Animated Film – Animafest Zagreb (2019): Grand Prix, Feature Film

Reception
The site's critical consensus reads, "Ruben Brandt, Collector is flawed from a storytelling standpoint, but the eye-catching animation is more than enough to make this offbeat thriller well worth watching."

References

External links
 
 
 

Sony Pictures Classics animated films
Films about the visual arts
Adult animated films
Art crime
Hungarian animated films
2018 crime thriller films
Hungarian crime thriller films
2018 animated films
2010s heist films
Hungarian multilingual films
Films about psychoanalysis
Films about dreams
2010s English-language films
2010s American films